The 2020 8 Hours of Bahrain was an endurance sportscar racing event that was held on 14 November 2020, as the season finale of the 2019–20 FIA World Endurance Championship. It was also the eighth running of the 8 Hours of Bahrain, and the second running in an extended 8 hours format. The race was won by the #7 Toyota TS050 Hybrid.

Background 
On 3 April 2020, a new revised calendar for the 2019–20 season was released, with another 8 Hours of Bahrain event, on 21 November 2020, replacing the cancelled 1000 Miles of Sebring.  The final round at Bahrain in November was moved up a week as a result of Formula One scheduling a double header event at that venue for the end of the month.

Results

Race
The minimum number of laps for classification (70% of the overall winning car's race distance) was 184 laps.

References 

8 Hours of Bahrain
Bahrain
8 Hours
8 Hours